Dhanraj is an Indian actor who appears in Telugu films and television. He started his career in films with Teja's film, Jai. Dhanraj entered Tollywood with only four hundred rupees, leaving his hometown and parents without notice. He worked in a hotel in Hyderabad and attended acting school. He was leading a team "Dhanadhan Dhanraj" in a popular TV comedy-show Jabardasth  telecast on ETV.

DhanRaj played opposite Lakshmi Manchu in the film, Pilavani Perantam. Dhanraj participated in Telugu reality series Bigg Boss 1. He got eliminated in the 6th week. He was team leader of "Dhanraj Blasters" in the comedy-show Adhirindhi on Zee Telugu.

Filmography

 Jai (2004)
 Jagadam (2007)
 Parugu (2008)
 Gopi Gopika Godavari (2009)
 Odipolama (2009) (Tamil)
 Bheemli Kabbadi Jattu (2010)
 Pilla Zamindar (2011)
 Madatha Kaja (2011)
 Nakoo O Loverundi (2011)
 Nenu Nanna Abaddam (2011)
Gaganam (2011)
 Ala Modalaindi (2011)
 Mem Vayasuku Vacham (2012)
 Housefull (2012)
 Eega (2012)
 Gabbar Singh (2012)
 Poola Rangadu (2012)
 Cameraman Gangatho Rambabu (2012)
Ayyare (2012)
Adda (2013)
 Abbai Class Ammai Mass (2013)
 Jaffa (2013) as Sujith
 Aha Naa Premanta (2013)
Priyathama Neevachata Kushalama (2013)
 Attarintiki Daredi (2013)
 Vintha Katha (2014)
Dalam (2013)
Koottam (2013) (Tamil)
 Music Magic (2013)
 Nenu Nene Ramune (2014)
Ee Varsham Sakshiga (2014) 
 Bhoo (2014)
 Naa Karma Kaali Poyindi (2014) 
 AK Rao PK Rao (2014)
 Jump Jilani (2014)
 Hridayam Ekkadunnadi (2014)
Raju Gari Gadhi (2015)
Bham Bolenath (2015)
Jyothi Lakshmi (2015)
Dhanalaxmi Thalupu Thadithe (2015) 
Gopala Gopala (2015)
Express Raja (2016)
Parvathipuram (2016)
Manamantha (2016)
Banthi Poola Janaki (2016)
Ekkadiki Pothavu Chinnavada (2016)
Meelo Evaru Koteeswarudu (2016)
Naanna Nenu Naa Boyfriends (2016)
Devi Sri Prasad (2017)
 Nagamani (2017)
London Babulu (2017)
C/o Surya (2017)
Oye Ninne (2017)
Bhaagamathie (2018) 
Hyderabad Love Story (2018)
Seven (2019)
Kathanam (2019)
Sivaranjani (2019)
Oh! Baby (2019)
Bhagyanagara Veedullo Gamattu (2019; producer)
Durgamati (2020) (Hindi)
Power Play (2021)
Induvadana (2022)
Bujji Ila Raa (2022)

Television

References

External links
Interview
Interview
 
 

Telugu comedians
Telugu male actors
Living people
Year of birth missing (living people)
Bigg Boss (Telugu TV series) contestants
People from West Godavari district
Male actors in Telugu television
Male actors in Telugu cinema
Indian male comedians
Male actors from Andhra Pradesh
Indian comedians
Male actors in Tamil cinema
Male actors in Hindi cinema
Tamil comedians